The Toti class were submarines built for the Italian Navy in the 1960s. They were the first submarines designed and built in Italy since World War II. These boats were small and designed as "hunter killer" anti-submarine submarines. They are comparable to the German Type 205 submarines and the French s.

Ships
All four ships were built by Italcantieri (Fincantieri) to Monfalcone (Gorizia) shipyard.

References

External links 
 S506 Enrico Toti (Enrico Toti Class)
  – Official Site for the Enrico Toti submarine museum, Milan

Submarine classes
 
Ships built by Fincantieri